Louco Amor is a Portuguese telenovela.

Cast
Cast on the official website:
Ruy de Carvalho as Óscar Ribeirinho
Rodrigo Figueiredo as Tiago Morais
Adriana Sá as Inês Morais
Victor Emanuel as Pedro Morais
Marta Fernandes as Joana Morais
Patrícia Candoso as Beatriz Sousa (Bia)
Martinho da Silva as Tomás Soeiro
Bárbara Norton de Matos as Berta Abreu
Pedro Górgia as Henrique Antunes (Riky)
Rebeca Gonçalves as Marina Miranda
Sofia Grillo as Gisela Miranda (Gi)
Fernanda Serrano as Violeta Martins
José Raposo as Egídio Onofre
Isabel Medina as Custódia Veloz
Simone de Oliveira as Carlota Caetano Menezes
Sara Prata as Patrícia Rebelo Corvo
Rita Salema as Marta Rebelo Corvo
Tozé Martinho as Filipe Pimenta
Nicolau Breyner as Carlos Correia
Liliana Santos as Mafalda Mendes
José Carlos Pereira as Duarte Mendes
David Carreira as Francisco Correia (Chico)
Lourenço Mimoso as Miguel Correia
Helena Isabel as Graça Correia
Suzana Borges as Leonor Correia
Luís Esparteiro as Rafael Correia
Elsa Galvão as Hermínia Veloz
Diana Nicolau as Carla Veloz Alegria (Carlinha)
Helder Agapito as Júlio Davin
Márcia Breia as Lucinda Rocha
Mafalda Luís de Castro as Margarida Rocha

References

Portuguese telenovelas
Televisão Independente telenovelas
2012 Portuguese television series debuts
2013 Portuguese television series endings
2012 telenovelas
Portuguese-language telenovelas